The Men's 100 kg event at the 2010 South American Games was held on March 19.

Medalists

Results

Main Bracket

Repechage

References
Report

M100
South American Games 2010